Elections to West Sussex County Council were held on 5 May 2005.  The whole council was up for election and the Conservatives held overall control.

Election Result

|}

Results by electoral divisions

Adur

Arun

Chichester

Crawley

Horsham

Mid Sussex

Worthing

References
West Sussex County Council

2005 English local elections
2005
2000s in West Sussex